Catherine Gallagher (born 16 February 1945) is an American historicist, literary critic, and Victorianist, and is Professor Emerita of English at the University of California, Berkeley. Gallagher is the author of Nobody's Story: The Vanishing Acts of Women Writers in the Marketplace, 1670-1820 (1994), which documented significant literary works that had previously been overlooked. Gallagher is also the author of The Body Economic : Life, Death, and Sensation in Political Economy and the Victorian Novel (2005) and Telling It Like It Wasn’t: The Counterfactual Imagination in History and Fiction (2018). She is married to Martin Jay, a faculty member of the History department at UC Berkeley. She gave the 1996 Master-Mind Lecture.
She is a recipient of the Berlin Prize Fellowship from the American Academy in Berlin (2011) and the Jacques Barzun Prize in Cultural History (2018). In 2020 she was elected to the American Philosophical Society.

Selected works
Telling It Like It Wasn’t: The Counterfactual Imagination in History and Fiction. Chicago: University of Chicago Press, 2018.
The Body Economic : Life, Death, and Sensation in Political Economy and the Victorian Novel. Princeton: Princeton University Press, 2005. 2008 pbk edition
Practicing New Historicism. With Stephen Greenblatt. Chicago: University of Chicago Press, 2000.
Nobody's Story. The Vanishing Acts of Women Writers in the Marketplace, 1670-1820. Berkeley: University of California Press, 1994.
The Industrial Reformation of English Fiction. Social Discourse and Narrative Form, 1832-67. Chicago: University of Chicago Press, 1985
Oroonoko; or, The Royal Slave, by Aphra Behn. Bedford Cultural Edition. Ed., intros, and headnotes. Bedford Books, 1999. With Simon Stern.
The Making of the Modern Body. Sexuality and Society in the Nineteenth Century. Ed. and intro. with Thomas Laqueur. Berkeley: University of California Press, 1987.

See also
Stephen Greenblatt
Literary theory
New historicism

References

1945 births
Living people
20th-century American non-fiction writers
21st-century American non-fiction writers
20th-century American women writers
21st-century American women writers
American literary critics
Women literary critics
New Historicism
University of California, Berkeley College of Letters and Science faculty
Members of the American Philosophical Society
American women critics